Raymond Scardin (12 April 1924 – 6 December 2009) was a French racing cyclist. He rode in the 1952 Tour de France.

References

1924 births
2009 deaths
French male cyclists
Place of birth missing